The great bulk of Frédéric Chopin's output consists of pieces for solo piano: his ballades, études, impromptus, mazurkas, nocturnes, polonaises, preludes, rondos, scherzos, sonatas and waltzes.  There are also the two piano concertos, four other works for piano and orchestra, and a small amount of chamber music.

However, Chopin also produced a number of other compositions, mostly for solo piano, but some for other forces.  Some of these are well-known, such as the Barcarolle in F-sharp, the Fantaisie in F minor, the Berceuse in D-flat, and some of the 19 Polish songs.  Most of the other lesser-known works were published only after his death, contrary to his express wishes that all his unpublished manuscripts should be burned.

While often disregarded in the concert repertoire (particularly the posthumously published works), these miscellaneous works are nevertheless part of his oeuvre and must have been recorded, in some cases numerous times.

Posthumous opus numbers and other catalogue designations
Chopin expressed a death-bed wish that all his unpublished manuscripts be destroyed. However, at the request of the composer's mother and sisters, Julian Fontana selected 23 unpublished piano pieces and grouped them into eight posthumous opus numbers (Opp. 66–73). These works were published in 1855, and include the Fantaisie-Impromptu, 8 mazurkas, 5 waltzes, 3 polonaises, 3 écossaises, a nocturne, a rondo, and a Marche funèbre.  In 1857, 17 of Chopin's Polish songs were published as Op. 74.

Various other works have been subsequently published, but have not been given opus numbers.  They are identified by alternative numbers from the catalogues of: 
 Maurice J. E. Brown (B),
 Krystyna Kobylańska (KK), and 
 Josef Michał Chominski (A, C, D, E, P, S).

Extant miscellaneous works

 * All for piano solo except where otherwise indicated.

Lost, destroyed, unavailable, doubtful and spurious works
There remain a number of works:
 whose MS are lost, destroyed, or unavailable to researchers; or
 whose authenticity is doubtful or spurious.

 * For piano solo unless otherwise indicated.

References

Miscellaneous
Compositions for solo piano
Lists of piano compositions by composer
Lists of compositions by composer